Sally Mursi (ar: سالي مرسي, born March 30, 1968) is an Egyptian entertainer and transgender woman. Her sex reassignment surgery in 1988 was a source of controversy and lawsuits in Egypt.

Transition 
Prior to pursuing medical operations, Mursi consulted with psychologist Salwa Jirjis Labib and underwent three years of conversion therapy, after which Labib referred her to a surgeon. Mursi was further referred to plastic surgeon Ezzat Ashamallah, who affirmed the diagnosis of "psychological hermaphroditism" and prescribed hormone replacement therapy for one year prior performing surgery on January 29, 1988.

At the same period, Muhammad Sayyid Tantawy also released a Fatwa, recognizing that Sally Mursi needed the surgery for her health and that it was spiritually legal to change sex for transgender people, if their doctors said they needed it. But said that before Mursi could get the surgery, she had to follow all the rules of islam for women during a year, except the one about mariage.

Legal battle 
As a medical student at Al-Azhar University, Mursi had been suspended pre-transition for wearing women's clothing. When she returned post-transition, the university expelled her and initiated a legal battle against the physician Ashamallah, causing him to be removed from the Physician’s Syndicate. The Syndicate requested a fatwa on the case from Sheikh Muhammad Sayyid Tantawy, who designated the issue as a medical condition and subject to physician's discretion. Al-Azhar brought the case against Ashamallah to court, in which process Sally was subjected to a full body examination. The examiner confirmed the diagnosis and Ashamallah was acquitted.

References 

Egyptian women
Transgender women
Egyptian LGBT entertainers
Belly dancers
1968 births
Living people
Egyptian female dancers
Al-Azhar University alumni
Transgender entertainers